"Space Guitar" is an instrumental composed and recorded by American rhythm and blues artist Johnny "Guitar" Watson. Released as a single in 1954, it was Watson's first recording to showcase his guitar playing. The backing arrangement for the piece is fairly typical for R&B and jump blues at the time. However, Watson's groundbreaking performance on the electric guitar sets it apart.

When it was released, a reviewer in Billboard was at a loss to describe it or assign it a numerical rating. Subsequently, the single did not appear in the magazine's charts.  More current assessments describe the instrumental as being well ahead of its time with Watson's over-the-top guitar playing  and the heavy use of audio effects. Guitarists, such as Bo Diddley, Ike Turner, Frank Zappa, and Jimi Hendrix have been identified as being influenced by Watson's novel approach.  "Space Guitar" is included on several Watson and various artists compilations.

Background
By April 1954, Watson had recorded three singles for Federal Records under the name "Young John Watson". Ralph Bass, the veteran rhythm-and-blues record producer, handled the production, but none had managed to reach the record charts. Watson, who was then 19 years old, had been performing primarily as a vocalist and pianist and other guitarists also appeared on his records. However, for "Space Guitar" he "came into his own as a guitarist", according to music historian Larry Birnbaum.

Originally from Texas, Watson was influenced by T-Bone Walker and Clarence "Gatemouth" Brown, but also incorporated his own ideas: "I was seeing all these new sounds I could create... I wasn't afraid to take it a little further and see where it went."  Commenting on his early style, Jon Hartley Fox wrote: "With jagged blurts of notes, a highly amplified tone, and quirky improvisational ideas, Watson stepped out fully formed as a major stylist." He was also a flamboyant performer and played the guitar with his teeth, behind his head, and while roaming through the audience and beyondtricks in the style of Walker and Guitar Slim.

Composition and recording

Except for the guitar, "Space Guitar" has the sound and instrumentation typical for the time. It has been described as rhythm and blues, jump blues, and a blues guitar instrumental. The piece uses a stop-time arrangement, when the other musicians drop out during breaks. During these, Watson plays various guitar figures, including the introduction from the theme music from Dragnet, a popular 1950s television series, before the accompaniment resumes. However, it is Watson's guitar fills, soloing, and the novel use of the rather new reverb effect that have received the most attention.

Birnbaum describes Watson's guitar work as "furious bursts of notes, talking-guitar effects, jangling chords, jarring starts and stops, and wrenching blasts of echo and reverb". Although he fingerpicked the electric guitar, instead of the more common technique with guitar pick, Watson's playing has been described as "hyper-speed" and "rapid-fire". He also used exaggerated string bending and finger slides up and down the neck, which is further emphasized by the intermittent use of heavy reverb.

In the early 1950s, reverb, as an added audio effect in the studio, was "really the only 'effect' available in those days", according to Dan Forte of Guitar Player magazine. It was an attempt to reproduce natural reverberation, in which sounds dissipate more slowly, as in an empty hall or other large space. Reverb has also been used in recordings as "a metaphor for solitude and wide open spaces [and] the vast expanse of outer space". In an interview in 1994, Watson explained that it was also "a great way to sustain notes". Rather than being applied to the same degree throughout or for soloing, in "Space Guitar", reverberated elements dramatically jump in and out at various points in the recording, in what one educator calls "extreme or impossible mixes of spatial sound with the 'dry' [unprocessed] signal". 

As with Watson's previous singles, "Space Guitar" was produced by Ralph Bass. The recording session took place in Los Angeles in February 1954, with backing musicians Devonia Willams on piano, Bill Gaither on tenor sax (who plays a 20-second solo about half-way through), Mario Delagarde on bass, and Charles Pendergraft on drums. According to Watson, a remark by the unnamed recording engineer inspired the title for the instrumental: "I don't know what you're trying to do, man, but Jesus, man, what is it? Are you some kind of spaceman?"

Release and reception
"Space Guitar" was released by Federal Records in April 1954. Coupled with the Rudy Toombs composition "Half Pint-a-Whiskey", it was issued on both the 78 rpm and 45 rpm record formats, but without A- or B-side designations. A staff reviewer in Billboard magazine gave "Half Pint-a-Whiskey" a favorable score of 80 (out of 100), while "Space Guitar" received a puzzled "??", instead of a numeric rating. The short review concluded with "This could break a few eardrums if it's played too loud.  It's unusual, has a sound and in a way, it moves. Most unusual wax, and an intriguing coupling for the flip."

Similar to Watson's earlier singles, neither song reached the singles charts and the instrumental was not included on any albums. Feeling that Cincinnati, Ohio-based Federal/King label was not promoting his records adequately, he subsequently signed with the Los Angeles-based Modern Records group of labels. There, he adopted the stage name "Johnny 'Guitar' Watson" (inspired by the 1954 Western Johnny Guitar) and in 1955, he enjoyed his first success on the charts with the slower R&B ballad "Those Lonely Nights".

Legacy

More recently, "Space Guitar" has received critical commentary from a variety of sources. Writing for All Music Guide to the Blues in 1996, critic Richie Unterberger identified the instrumental as "rank[ing] with the greatest achievements of its era [and] presages futuristic effects that rock guitarists still hadn't mastered another 15 years down the line." He later added that it was "one of the relatively obscure classics of the mid-50s." Others have also commented on the forward-looking aspect of the piece: a "tour de force that in terms of both sound and technique was at least a decade ahead of its time" (Batey); and "too freakishly futuristic to sell in its own day" (Birnbaum).

Its more discordant elements have been described as "atonal, dissonant and fractured with reverb, distortion and shredding" (MacDonald); and "[one of the] early rock instrumentals that can be analyzed as examples of 'avant rock' as far as the disconcerting use of dissonance and noise" (Greene). Some writers suggest that "Space Guitar" also features an early use of guitar feedback, although "there is, in fact, no feedback on the record", according to Premier Guitar magazine writer Michael Ross.

Music writer Cub Koda identified Watson as "a futuristic guitarist who influenced Bo Diddley and Ike Turner in the instrument-as-noisemaker department [with] 1954's 'Space Guitar. According to Frank Zappa biographer John Corcelli, "when he heard Watson's classic instrumental 'Space Guitar' (Federal, 1954), it proved such an epiphany that Zappa adjusted the tone of his guitar to match Watson's when he started playing". Justin Patch wrote that the instrumental "no doubt influenced the sound and imagination of young Jimi Hendrix" and Birnbaum called it "a harbinger of Jimi Hendrix".

"Space Guitar" received more attention when it was later included on several compilation albums of Watson's early singles, such as I Heard That (1985, Charly Records), Gangster of Love (1990, Charly), and The Very Best of Johnny "Guitar" Watson (1999, Rhino Entertainment). The various artists collections The King R&B Box Set (1996, King) and Honky Tonk! The King & Federal R&B Instrumentals (2000, Ace Records) also include the piece.

Personnel
Johnny "Guitar" Watsonelectric guitar
Devonia Willamspiano
Bill Gaithertenor sax
Mario Delagardebass
Charles Pendergraftdrums
Ralph Bassproducer

References

Bibliography

1950s instrumentals
1954 singles
Federal Records singles
Experimental rock songs